Paul Schulze was "the most important German tick taxonomist of the early 20th century."  Between 1929 and 1937, he described 19 genera, 17 subgenera, 150 species and 150 subspecies of ixodid ticks.  He was essentially an amateur taxonomist, working alone for most of his career, not consulting the major tick collections or collaborating with other tick taxonomists.

Life and career
Born Leopold Ernst Paul Schulze on November 20, 1887, in Berlin, he graduated from high school in 1907 and studied science in Berlin, where in 1910 he became an assistant at the Zoological Institute of the University of Berlin.  In 1911 he was awarded the Doctor of Philosophy degree in Zoology from the University of Berlin.  The title of his dissertation was Die Nackengabel der Papilionidenraupen (The Osmeterium of the Papilionidae).

During World War I, Schulze served as a soldier in a support role, behind the front lines, due to a heart problem. After this compulsory service, he completed post-doctoral work at the University of Berlin in 1918.

In 1923, Schulze was appointed a full professor at the University of Rostock, serving from 1923 to 1945 as Professor of Zoology and Comparative Anatomy, Dean of the Faculty of Arts from 1931 to 1932, and as a Rector from December 1932 to March 1936.  His professional contributions included serving as co-director of the university entomology seminar, co-editorship of Zeitschrift für Morphologie und Ökologie der Tiere (Journal of Morphology and Ecology of Animals), and serving as Secretary of the Verein der Freunde der Naturgeschichte in Mecklenburg (Association of Friends of Natural History in Mecklenburg).

In 1945, Schulze was dismissed from university service as a consequence of his membership in the National Socialist German Workers Party, which he had joined in 1937.

Schulze died on May 13, 1949, in Rostock.

Legacy
Although many of the scientific names bestowed by Schulze have been synonymized, they remain important as molecular and morphological studies result in the reinstatement of other names that were once considered synonyms.

Contemporary tick specialists praise Schulze's "perception of the complexity of the genus Dermacentor (under Indocentor) in the Oriental and Australasian zoogeographic regions, and his understanding of tick biodiversity in these regions" which "constitute seminal scientific achievements."

Ticks named by Schulze
 Amblyomma babirussae Schulze, 1933
 Amblyomma quadricavum Schulze, 1941
 Dermacentor confragus Schulze, 1933
 Dermacentor sinicus Schulze, 1932
 Dermacentor steini Schulze, 1933
 Haemaphysalis bartelsi Schulze, 1938
 Haemaphysalis heinrichi Schulze, 1939
 Haemaphysalis hylobatis Schulze, 1933
 Haemaphysalis renschi Schulze, 1933
 Hyalomma albiparmatum Schulze, 1919
 Hyalomma impeltatum Schulze & Schlottke, 1930
 Hyalomma nitidum Schulze, 1919
 Hyalomma scupense Schulze, 1919
 Ixodes apronophorus Schulze, 1924
 Ixodes arboricola Schulze & Schlottke, 1930
 Ixodes collocaliae Schulze, 1937
 Ixodes cumulatimpunctatus Schulze, 1943
 Ixodes luxuriosus Schulze, 1932
 Ixodes nuttallianus Schulze, 1930
 Ixodes persulcatus Schulze, 1930
 Ixodes priscicollaris Schulze, 1932
 Ixodes rugicollis Schulze & Schlottke, 1930
 Ixodes steini Schulze, 1932
 Ixodes vanidicus Schulze, 1943
 Rhipicephalus pilans Schulze, 1935
 Rhipicephalus pumilio Schulze, 1935

Ticks named in honor of Schulze
 Hyalomma schulzei Olenev, 1931
 Ixodes schulzei Aragão & Fonseca, 1951
 Rhipicephalus schulzei Olenev, 1929

References

External links
 Catalogus Professorum Rostochiensium entry with photo and portrait of Paul Schulze

20th-century German zoologists
1887 births
1949 deaths